Bheki Shabangu (born 21 September 1985 in KwaThema) is a South African association football player who played as a striker.

He has represented the South Africa Development XI, playing for them at the 2011 African Championship of Nations.

References

1985 births
Living people
People from KwaThema
Sportspeople from Gauteng
South African soccer players
South African Premier Division players
Association football forwards
Santos F.C. (South Africa) players
2011 African Nations Championship players
South Africa A' international soccer players